Simon Wilson is a British actor. He had a brief run on the television show EastEnders in 2010, playing the role of Mr. Steele. He also played the role of Andrew Parker Bowles in the 2005 made-for-television movie Charles & Camilla: Whatever Love Means.

Filmography

Film

Television

Stage

External links

References

Living people
Actors from Swindon
21st-century English male actors
Year of birth missing (living people)